Clarence Neace Eaton (August 8, 1887 – September 13, 1978) was an American politician in the state of Washington. He served in the Washington House of Representatives from 1937 to 1949.

References

Republican Party members of the Washington House of Representatives
1887 births
1978 deaths
20th-century American politicians
People from Waitsburg, Washington